Hanon W. Russell is a lawyer, chess expert, chess book author, translator, online chess magazine publisher and chess book store operator. He maintains his office in Milford, Connecticut.

Mr. Russell has been translating Russian chess literature for four decades, has had in the past a master's rating, collects chess memorabilia, and practiced law in Connecticut. Russell first became known during the Soviet era for translating Russian-language documents into English. He enjoyed exceptional access to Soviet materials.

Hanon Russell has been involved for many years with the United States Chess Federation.  He is the former publisher ChessCafe.com, a weekly chess publication online.

Books 
 Russian for Chess Players 
 A Chessplayer's Guide to Russian
 Correspondence Chess by Hanon W. Russell, Thinker's Press, 1980

External links
 
 Hanon W. Russell player profile and games at Chessgames.com 
 
 
 
 Books by Russell Enterprises
 ChessCafe Website

American chess players
American chess writers
American male non-fiction writers
Year of birth missing (living people)
Living people